Louise Petrine Amalie Phister, née Petersen, (1816–1914) was a Danish stage actress.

Life
 
Phister grew up in poverty; on her father's death, she applied to become a chorister at the Royal Danish Theatre. The theatre, discerning her talent for acting, instead enrolled her to study as an actress, and she became the maid and student of Anna Nielsen in 1829. Phister made her debut in 1835. She took many parts as a soubrette, appearing also in vaudeville, breeches parts and, eventually, in roles depicting old women. She was decorated with the medal in service for actors, Fortjenstmedaljen, in gold in 1885, and broke a record when she retired in 1895 after sixty seasons on the stage. Her last performance came in 1901, as a guest star.

She was married in 1846 to the actor Joachim Ludvig Phister.

Roles

1830s
1835: Barselstuen - Pige hos Corfitz
 1835: De to grenaderer - Suson, Mathurins datter
 1835: Maskerade - Leonora
 1835: Værtshuset - Louison, kammerpige
 1836: Den bogstavelige udtydning - Jenny
 1836: Den politiske kandestøber - Pige
 1836: Den skinsyge kone - Miss Russet
 1837: Henrik og Pernille - Pernille
 1837: Virtuosen nr. 2 - Juliane
 1838: Den bogstavelige udtydning - Jenny
 1838: Gert Westphaler - Pernille
 1838: Hekseri - Pige
 1838: Henrik den Fjerdes huslige liv - Dauphin, 15 år
 1838: Jacob von Thyboe - Pernille
 1838: Maskerade - Pernille
 1838: Vejen til ødelæggelse - Jenny

1840s
 1840: Barselstuen - Øllegaard Sværdfegers
 1840: Den politiske kandestøber - Anneke
 1840: Julestuen - Pernille
 1840: Kilderejsen - Pernille
 1841: Det lykkelige skibbrud - Pernille, Jeronius' pige
 1841: Scapins skalkestykker - Zerbinette
 1842: De usynlige - Columbine
 1842: Den gerrige - Frosine
 1842: Doktoren mod sin vilje - Martine
 1842: Jean de France - Marthe, Jeronimus' pige
 1843: Den honette ambition - Pernille
 1843: Den stundesløse - Pernille, stuepige
 1844: Don Juan - Karen, bondepige
 1844: Jægerne - Cordelia v. Zeck
 1845: Diderich Menschenskræk - Kaptajnens hustru
 1846: Barselstuen - Else Skolemesters
 1846: De usynlige - Columbine
 1846: Den adelige borger - Nicolette
 1846: Den stundesløse - Pernille, stuepige
 1846: Diderich Menschenskræk - Kaptajnens hustru
 1846: Don Juan - Karen, bondepige
 1846: Figaros giftermaal - Suzanne, grevindens kammerpige
 1846: Hekseri - Pige
 1846: Henrik og Pernille - Pernille
 1846: Jean de France - Marthe, Jeronimus' pige
 1846: Scapins skalkestykker - Zerbinette
 1846: Sganarels rejse til det filosofiske land - Agathe
 1847: Barselstuen - Øllegaard Sværdfegers
 1847: Det lykkelige skibbrud - Pernille, Jeronius' pige
 1847: Doktoren mod sin vilje - Martine
 1847: Fruentimmerskolen - Kirsten
 1847: Jægerne - Cordelia v. Zeck
 1847: Kærlighed uden strømper - Mette, Grethes fortrolige
 1848: Barselstuen - Else Skolemesters
 1848: Den politiske kandestøber - Anneke
 1848: Jacob von Tyhboe - Pernille
 1849: Den indbildt syge - Antoinette
 1849: Julestuen - Pernille
 1849: Maskerade - Pernille
 1849: Pernilles korte frøkenstand - Pernille
 1849: Som man behager - Phebe

1850s
 1850: Crispin sin herres rival - Pernille
 1850: Den vægelsindede - Pernille, Lucretias pige
 1850: Erasmus Montanus - Nille
 1850: Gulddaasen - Jomfru Trækom
 1850: Maskerade - Pernille
 1851: Den vægelsindede - Pernille, Lucretias pige
 1851: Gert Westphaler - Pernille
 1853:  Lovbud og lovbrud - Jaquenette
 1854: Det tvungne giftermaal - Dorimene, ung kokette
 1856: De usynlige - Columbine
 1858: Den listige advokat - Colotte, Patelins tjenestepige
 1858: Medbejlerne - Terne
 1859: Kilderejsen - Pernille

1960s
 
 1860: Den vægelsindede - Pernille, Lucretias pige
 1860: Jægerne - Madam Warberger
 1861: De lystige passagerer - Madame Saint-Hilaire, skuespilerinde
 1861: Den honette ambition - Pernille
 1861: Viola - Maria
 1862: Jeppe paa Bjerget - Nille, Jeppes hustru
 1863: Scapins skalkestykker - Nerine, Hyacinthes amme
 1866: Det arabiske pulver - Pernille
 1866: Pernilles korte frøkenstand - Pernille
 1869: Geniets komedie - Alvilda Brummer

1870s
 1870: Grøns Fødselsdag - Madam Bek, husholderske
 1873: Henrik og Pernille - Pernille
 1874: Det lykkelige skibbrud - Magdelone
 1874: Fejltagelserne - Fru Hardcastle
 1874: Pernilles korte frøkenstand - Magdelone
 1876: Maskerade - Magdelone
 1877: De usynlige - Harlelins usynlige
 1877: Henrik IV - Madam Raskenfart

1880s

 1880: Barselstuen - Gedske Klokkers
 1880: Den pantsatte bondedreng - Gertrud
 1880: Henrik IV - Madam Raskenfart
 1881: Jean de France - Magdelone, Frands' hustru
 1882: Den forvandlede brudgom - Fru Terentia
 1882: Henrik og Pernille - Magdelone, gammel kone
 1884: Ulysses von Ithacia - Dronning Dido
 1885: Henrik og Pernille - Magdelone, gammel kone

1890s
 1889: Jacob von Tyboe - Leonora
 1891: Hedda Gabler - Juliane Tesman

References 

 http://www.kvinfo.dk/side/597/bio/1851/origin/170/
 Roles

Danish stage actresses
19th-century Danish actresses
1816 births
1914 deaths
Burials at Holmen Cemetery